Sujon Sokhi is a 1975 Bangladeshi film directed by Khan Ataur Rahman. The film was remade in West Bengal(India) in 1995  with the same title, which was directed by Swapan Saha. The film received critical acclaim, particularly for the performance given by Kabori Sarwar, who won Bachsas Award for Best Actress. Both Sabina Yasmin and Abdul Alim earned Bangladesh National Film Awards for the song "Sob Sokhire Par Korite".

Plot
Lokhman, his wife and their son Sujon live with his step mother, step brother Solaiman and his pregnant wife whom Lokhman and his wife detest. However, they think of them as their own and Solaiman and his mother love Sujon a lot. Lokhman and his wife later throw them out of the house with Solaiman giving his wealth share to Sujon. Solaiman and his family start a new life however his wife dies after giving birth to their daughter Sokhi which heartbreaks him more. Years, later Sujon and Sokhi fall in love and vow to reunite the family together.

Cast
 Kabori Sarwar as Sokhi
 Farooque as Sujon 
 Sumita Devi-Sujon's mother
 Siraj Haider
Khan Ataur Rahman-Solaiman
Rawshan Jamil-Solaiman's mother

Music
All music were composed by Khan Ataur Rahman.

"Sob Sokhire Par Korite" - Sabina Yasmin and Abdul Alim

Awards
Bangladesh National Film Awards
Best Screenplay - Khan Ataur Rahman
Best Male Playback Singer - Abdul Alim
Best Female Playback Singer - Sabina Yasmin

Bachsas Awards
Best Actress - Kabori Sarwar

References

External links
 

1975 films
Bengali-language Bangladeshi films
Films scored by Khan Ataur Rahman
1970s Bengali-language films